Quadrus is a genus of skippers in the family Hesperiidae.

Species
Quadrus cerialis (Stoll, [1782])
Quadrus contubernalis (Mabille, 1883)
Quadrus deyrollei (Mabille, 1887)
Quadrus fanda Evans, 1953
Quadrus francesius Freeman, 1969
Quadrus ineptus (Draudt, 1922)
Quadrus jacobus (Plötz, 1884)
Quadrus lugubris (R. Felder, 1869)
Quadrus tros Evans, 1953
Quadrus truncata (Hewitson, 1870)
Quadrus u-lucida (Plötz, 1884)

References

External links
Natural History Museum Lepidoptera genus database

Pyrginae
Hesperiidae genera